Tretodictyidae is a family of glass sponges in the order Sceptrulophora.

Genera
The family Tretodictyidae includes the following genera.
 Anomochone Ijima, 1927
 Hexactinella Carter, 1885
 Psilocalyx Ijima, 1927
 Sclerothamnopsis Wilson, 1904
 Sclerothamnus Marshall, 1875
 Tretocalyx Schulze, 1901
 Tretodictyum Schulze, 1886

References

Hexactinellida
Sponge families